Rajpur Vidhan Sabha constituency may refer to:
 Rajpur, Bihar Assembly constituency
 Rajpur, Madhya Pradesh Assembly constituency